Vesuvianite, also known as idocrase, is a green, brown, yellow, or blue silicate mineral. Vesuvianite occurs as tetragonal crystals in skarn deposits and limestones that have been subjected to contact metamorphism.  It was first discovered within included blocks or adjacent to lavas on Mount Vesuvius, hence its name. Attractive-looking crystals are sometimes cut as gemstones. Localities which have yielded fine crystallized specimens include Mount Vesuvius and the Ala Valley near Turin, Piedmont.

The name "vesuvianite" was given by Abraham Gottlob Werner in 1795, because fine crystals of the mineral are found at Vesuvius; these are brown in color and occur in the ejected limestone blocks of Monte Somma. Several other names were applied to this species, one of which, "idocrase" by René Just Haüy in 1796, is now in common use.

A sky bluish variety known as cyprine has been reported from Franklin, New Jersey and other locations; the blue is due to impurities of copper in a complex calcium aluminum sorosilicate.  Californite is a name sometimes used for jade-like vesuvianite, also known as California jade, American jade or Vesuvianite jade. Xanthite is a manganese rich variety. Wiluite is an optically positive variety from Wilui, Siberia. Idocrase is an older synonym sometimes used for gemstone-quality vesuvianite.

References

Additional sources 
 
 Webmineral data
 Vesuvianite at Franklin-Sterling
 Mindat - Cyprine variants with location data

Calcium minerals
Magnesium minerals
Aluminium minerals
Mount Vesuvius
Gemstones
Geology of Italy
Sorosilicates
Tetragonal minerals
Minerals in space group 126